One St. Petersburg is a 41-story high rise condominium located in the city of St. Petersburg, Florida, United States. The high rise contains 253 condominium rooms that range from 1,400 to 2,500 square feet. The building's second high rise includes a hotel across the lot with 174 rooms, 13 stories high. The ground level of the building contains retail space. Construction began on November 16, 2015, and was completed in 2019, after a delay from the original planned date of 2018.

Gallery

See also 
 List of tallest buildings in St. Petersburg

References 

Residential skyscrapers in Florida
Residential buildings completed in 2019
Buildings and structures in St. Petersburg, Florida
2019 establishments in Florida